Utterbackia is a genus of freshwater mussels, aquatic bivalve mollusks in the family Unionidae.

Species
Species within the genus Utterbackia include: 
 Utterbackia imbecillis
 Utterbackia peggyae
 Utterbackia peninsularis

References

 Haag, W. R. (2012). North American Freshwater Mussels: Natural History, Ecology, and Conservation. Cambridge University Press. 
 Vidrine, M. (1993). The historical distributions of fresh-water mussels in Louisiana. Gail O. Vidrine Collectibles. 

 
Bivalve genera